The 2018 Illinois Fighting Illini football team represented the University of Illinois at Urbana–Champaign as a member of the West Division of the Big Ten Conference during the 2018 NCAA Division I FBS football season. Led by third-year head coach Lovie Smith, the Fighting Illini compiled an overall record of 4–8 with a mark of 2–7 in conference play, placing last out of seven teams in the Big Ten's West Division. Illinois played home games at Memorial Stadium in Champaign, Illinois.

Previous season
The Fighting Illini finished the 2017 season 2–10, 0–9 in Big Ten play to finish in last place in the West Division.

Offseason

Recruiting

Position key

Recruits
The Fighting Illini signed a total of 17 recruits on Early National Signing Day on December 20, 2017.

Award watch lists
Listed in the order that they were released

Schedule
The 2018 schedule consisted of seven home and five away games in the regular season. The Fighting Illini hosted Big Ten foes Penn State, Purdue, Minnesota, Iowa, and traveled to Rutgers, Wisconsin, Maryland, Nebraska and Northwestern.

The Fighting Illini hosted all three non-conference opponents, Kent State from the Mid-American Conference, Western Illinois from Missouri Valley Football Conference, and South Florida from the American Athletic Conference. The South Florida game was played at Soldier Field, home of the Chicago Bears.

Game summaries

Kent State

Western Illinois

South Florida

Penn State

at Rutgers

Purdue

at Wisconsin

at Maryland

Minnesota

at Nebraska

Iowa

at Northwestern

Roster

Awards and honors

Players drafted into the NFL

References

Illinois
Illinois Fighting Illini football seasons
Illinois Fighting Illini football